The Weather Girls are an American female duo whose best-known line-up comprised Martha Wash and Izora Armstead. Formed in 1976 in San Francisco, California, The Weather Girls members began their musical career as Two Tons O' Fun, the female backup duo for disco singer Sylvester. After years of limited success singing background for Sylvester, the duo was signed in 1979 to Fantasy Records. The Weather Girls were launched into mainstream recognition following the release of their best-selling single, "It's Raining Men" (1982), which became their first number-one dance song. Despite critical and commercial success, the duo struggled to repeat the success of "It's Raining Men" and ultimately disbanded after the release of their self-titled fifth album The Weather Girls in 1988.

In 1991, Armstead reformed the duo with her daughter Dynelle Rhodes. Over the course of a decade, the duo released three albums: Double Tons of Fun (1993), Think Big!, and Puttin' On The Hits (1999). In 2004, Armstead died and was replaced with Ingrid Arthur in 2005. Following the release of two albums Totally Wild! (2005) and The Woman I Am (2009), Arthur left the group and was replaced with Dorrey Lin Lyles in 2012.

The group received a Grammy Award nomination for Best R&B Performance By A Duo Or Group With Vocal in 1983.

History

1970–1975: Formation and early years
Izora Rhodes and Martha Wash met at a young age. Wash attended Church of God in Christ, which was an alley away from the Baptist church Rhodes was attending. Rhodes was the lead vocalist and pianist of the San Francisco Inspirational Choir. Wash and Rhodes eventually landed in a gospel group called N.O.W. (News of the World). While performing part-time in the group, Wash worked as a secretary for UC Hospital while Rhodes worked as a bartender and a nurse assistant. Rhodes also worked as a piano and vocal teacher.

1976–1979: Sylvester and the Two Tons o Fun
In February 1976, Wash auditioned as a backup singer before American singer-songwriter Sylvester and his manager Brent Thomson. Impressed with her vocal performance, Sylvester inquired if she had another large black friend who could sing, after which she introduced him to Izora Rhodes. Although he referred to them simply as "the girls", Wash and Rhodes formed a musical duo called Two Tons O' Fun. Two Tons O' Fun debuted as Sylvester's backing vocalists on his self-titled third album Sylvester, released in 1977. The duo sang backup vocals on the album's singles "Down, Down, Down" and "Over and Over", which charted at number eighteen on the Billboard Dance chart.

In 1978, Sylvester released his fourth album Step II, in which The Two Tons also contributed background vocals throughout the album. They performed backing vocals on the singles "Dance (Disco Heat)" and "You Make Me Feel (Mighty Real)" which both peaked at number one on Billboards Dance chart. In 1979, the duo secured their own record deal with Fantasy Records. That same year, Two Tons O' Fun sang background on Sylvester's live album Living Proof, one of their final performances together. As they began to work on their own album, the duo appeared in fewer shows with Sylvester.

1980–1981: Debut album and Backatcha
On January 24, 1980, the duo released their debut self-titled album Two Tons o' Fun. The album spawned two top-five dance singles: "Earth Can Be Just Like Heaven" and "I Got the Feeling". Shortly after the release of the album, they changed their name to The Two Tons after being informed that an Oklahoma gospel act had already registered the group name "Two Tons o Fun" with ASCAP since 1958. Their second album Backatcha was released later that year. The album spawned a single "I Depend On You" that peaked at number seventy-two on the Dance chart. The follow-up single "Never Like This" peaked at number fifty-five on the R&B chart.

1982–1988: The Weather Girls and breakthrough
In September 1982, the duo released their single "It's Raining Men", and changed their duo title to The Weather Girls, a name chosen as a pun on the song's subject. The song became their biggest hit to date, peaking at number one on the Dance chart and number forty-six on Billboard'''s Hot 100 chart. The song also peaked at number two on the UK Singles Chart, and became certified Silver-status for sales exceeding 200,000 copies in the United Kingdom. "It's Raining Men" received a nomination at the 26th Annual Grammy Awards (1983) for Best R&B Performance By A Duo Or Group With Vocal. On January 22, 1983, they released their third album Success. Despite the overall success of the album's lead single, the album experienced mild success. The album's title-track "Success" was released as the second single and peaked at number eighty-nine on the R&B chart. Two additional singles, "I'm Gonna Wash That Man Right Outa My Hair" and "Dear Santa (Bring Me a Man This Christmas)", were also released but failed to chart.

In 1984, The Weather Girls performed backing vocals on the million-selling single "Centipede" by Rebbie Jackson. The song was written, arranged, and produced by Michael Jackson, who also sang background vocals on the song. It reached number 4 on the Black Singles Chart and was certified gold by the Recording Industry Association of America. In 1985, The Weather Girls released their fourth album Big Girls Don't Cry. The album's singles "Well-A-Wiggy" and "No One Can Love You More Than Me" experienced moderate success and had poor promotion. In 1988, The Weather Girls released their self-titled fifth album The Weather Girls, party produced by Full Force and Reggie Lucas, which was ultimately seen as a commercial failure by their record label. Shortly after the album, The Weather Girls disbanded and Wash took up a solo career and also began working as a session vocalist.

1991–2003: Reformation
After a three-year hiatus and Wash pursuing her solo career, Armstead reformed The Weather Girls with her daughter Dynelle Rhodes and relocated to Germany in 1991. Their first album together Double Tons of Fun was released in 1993. The album's lead single "Can You Feel It" peaked at number two on Billboards Dance chart. The song also peaked at number 75 on Germany's music chart, their second single to enter that chart since "It's Raining Men". While touring the club circuit, the album's third single "We Shall All Be Free" peaked at number 80 on Germany's music chart. Their follow-up album Think Big! was released in December 1995. The album saw Armstead's contribution as a songwriter and penning several songs, including the album's third single "The Sound of Sex (Ooh Gitchie O-La-La-Ay)", which was written with her daughter. The album also contained a cover version of Sylvester's 1979 disco hit "Stars", recorded as a duet with Scottish pop singer Jimmy Somerville.

In 1999, The Weather Girls released their eighth studio album Puttin' On The Hits, which contained a collection of covered disco songs. The non-album track "Big Brown Girl" was released as a single in 1999. In 2002, they joined the Disco Brothers for participation in the German National Final for the Eurovision Song Contest with their song "Get Up". In the end, the group only managed a 13th place out of 15.

2004–2012: Lineup change
On September 16, 2004, Izora Armstead died of heart failure at age 62. Prior to Armstead's passing, new member Ingrid Arthur joined The Weather Girls in 2004. Following Armstead's passing, they released the album Totally Wild. It scored an underground club hit with the single "Wild Thang" in 2004. In 2006, Joan Faulkner began performing with Rhodes and often substituting for Arthur. In 2008, the Weather Girls released a single "Break You", which topped the Dance chart. In 2009, the duo released a new studio album titled The Woman I Am. In 2012, The Weather Girls released "It's Raining Men 2K12", a newly recorded version of their 1982 hit, produced by Sebo Reed. In the same year, Arthur departed from The Weather Girls to focus on her solo career. Dorrey Lin Lyles, a singer who had worked with the duo in the past, was added to the duo in mid-2012.

2013–present: Recent activity
The Weather Girls began touring internationally in 2013. In 2018, they released a new single "We Need Love", produced by Torsten Abrolat, Terri B! and featuring, Jason Anousheh.

Legacy
Widely associated with their biggest song "It's Raining Men", VH1 ranked the song at thirty-five on their list of the 100 Greatest Dance Songs in 2000, and also at thirty-five in their 100 Greatest One-Hit Wonders of the 1980s in 2009. Paste Magazine ranked the song twelve in their list of The 60 Best Dancefloor Classics in February 2017.

"It's Raining Men" has often been perceived as a gay anthem. A campaign in Facebook was launched on January 19, 2014, to get the song to UK number one in response to a UKIP councillor blaming recent UK floods and adverse weather on divine retribution for the British government's introduction of gay marriage. The campaign was reported widely and The Weather Girls' version reached number 21 on the first day of the chart week. The song re-entered the UK Singles Chart in 2014 at number 31. In 2017, Rolling Stone included the song on their 25 Essential LGBTQ Pride Songs list. In 2018, Billboard ranked the song at number forty-seven on their The 50 Best Gay Anthems Of All Time list. The Gay UK'' ranked the song at number two on their Top 40 Gay Anthems for Pride list.

To date, The Weather Girls have accumulated an overall total of four number-one dance singles. Dynelle Rhodes holds the rights to the Weather Girls name and performs across Europe.

Members

Current members
 Dynelle Rhodes – co–lead vocals (1991–present)
 Dorrey Lin Lyles – co–lead vocals (2012–present)

Touring members
 Joan Faulkner – co–lead vocals (2006–present)

Former members
 Martha Wash – co–lead vocals (1976-1988)
 Izora Armstead – co–lead vocals (1976-1988), (1991–2004)
 Ingrid Arthur – co–lead vocals (2006–2012)

Faulkner often substitutes for and performs as the second member.

Discography

Albums

Singles

See also
List of number-one dance hits (United States)
List of artists who reached number one on the US Dance chart

References

External links
 
 

1976 establishments in California
1982 establishments in the United States
African-American girl groups
American disco girl groups
American hi-NRG groups
American pop music groups
American soul musical groups
American musical duos
American women in electronic music
Disco duos
Female musical duos
Electronic music duos
Columbia Records artists
Fantasy Records artists
Musical backing groups
Musical groups established in 1976
Musical groups established in 1982
Musical groups from San Francisco